Anj Smith (born 1978) is a British artist. She was born in Kent and studied at the Slade School of Fine Art and at Goldsmiths College in London. Her paintings are often on a small scale and highly detailed.

In 2006, she was short-listed for the MaxMara Award for Women at the Whitechapel Art Gallery in London.

References 

1978 births
Living people
21st-century English women artists
Alumni of Goldsmiths, University of London
Alumni of the Slade School of Fine Art
Artists from Kent
British contemporary painters
English women painters